Andy Jozua Atmodimedjo (born March 16, 1967) is a Surinamese football manager and former player,  who is currently the manager of Inter Moengotapoe. He spent most of his professional playing career with S.V. Robinhood, winning four Hoofdklasse titles. He had previously played for Producers in the Hoofdklasse before joining Robinhood in 1986.

After retiring from playing, he went into management with Puwa Nani, followed by spells with S.V. Robinhood, WBC, Super Red Eagles, FCS Nacional, SV Boskamp, before returning to Puwa Nani in 2011. He has also managed the Suriname senior team and the under-21 team in the past.

Career 
Born in Paramaribo, Suriname, Atmodimedjo began his playing career in the youth ranks of Fajalobi, where he played until 1980. That year he transferred to Tuna, where he played for two seasons, before joining Producers from Pontbuiten. In 1982, Atmodimedjo joined the youth of Producers, before making his Hoofdklasse debut in 1985. He would join S.V. Robinhood after only one season with the club, while also taking his first coaching position with Celtic U-20 competing in the SVCB Randdistrict. In 1986, he joined S.V. Robinhood, where he would play for the remainder of his career. He helped Robinhood win four titles in nine seasons with the club.

International career 
Atmodimedjo played in the youth ranks of the Suriname national team. He played for the under-20 team that made third place at the 1983 CFU Youth Championship. Having played on various youth levels, he never made any appearances for the senior team.

Managerial career
Atmodimedjo took his first coaching position as a player of Robinhood, coaching the youth teams of Celtic. In 1997, he took the managerial position with Randdistrict club Puwa Nani, where he would coach for four seasons. In 2003, he took an apprenticeship with Dutch club AFC Ajax. In the meantime he graduated from the KNVB International Coaching Course in the Netherlands, returning to Suriname and taking a coaching position with his former club S.V. Robinhood as well as Walking Boyz Company. Atmodimedjo helped WBC to win the league title and the Suriname President's Cup in 2004. The year in which he was made the interim manager of the Suriname national team.

In 2005, he managed the Super Red Eagles in the Hoofdklasse, while managing the national under-20 team a year later at the same time. In 2007, he became the manager of FCS Nacional and then SV Boskamp a year later, before returning to Walking Boyz Company. In 2011, he resigned as manager, returning to Puwa Nani, competing in the SCVB Randdistrict but did not stay there for long. After nearly five years he signed a contract to be a coach once again, this time with Inter Moengotapoe (IMT). He will be the new manager of the eight time Hoofdklasse champions which will begin in the 2017 season. He signed with IMT because of their intentions of going to the CONCACAF Champions League.

Honors

Player

Club
Robinhood
 SVB Hoofdklasse (4): 1987, 1988, 1989, 1993

International
Suriname U-20
 CFU Youth Championship Third place: 1983

Manager
Walking Boyz Company
 SVB Hoofdklasse (1): 2004
 Suriname President's Cup (1): 2004

References 

Living people
1967 births
Sportspeople from Paramaribo
Surinamese footballers
Suriname youth international footballers
Surinamese football managers
S.V. Robinhood managers
S.V. Walking Boyz Company managers
S.V. Robinhood players
SVB Eerste Divisie players
SVB Eerste Divisie managers
Surinamese businesspeople
Surinamese people of Javanese descent
Association football defenders
Suriname under-20 international footballers